Edinburghshire, a historic shire of medieval Scotland, also known as Midlothian.

Edinburghshire may also refer to:
Edinburghshire (Parliament of Scotland constituency)
Edinburghshire (UK Parliament constituency)
Edinburghshire Constabulary (1975–2013), the Lothian and Borders Police for the Scottish councils of Edinburgh, Midlothian, and others.